Eric Jensen may refer to:

 Eric Jensen (racing driver) (born 1970), Canadian race team owner and race car driver
 Eric Jensen (Neighbours), a character from the soap opera Neighbours

See also  
 Erik Jensen (disambiguation)